Gabriel Nicolae Buta (born 29 January 2002) is a Romanian professional footballer who plays as a center back for Liga II side Unirea Dej, on loan from Farul Constanța.

Club career

Viitorul Constanta
He made his league debut on 26 April 2021 in Liga I match against Voluntari.

Career statistics

Club

References

External links
 
 
 

2002 births
Living people
People from Salonta
Romanian footballers
Romania youth international footballers
Association football defenders
Liga I players
Liga II players
Liga III players
FC Viitorul Constanța players
FCV Farul Constanța players
FC Unirea Dej players